Dongo (Donga, Dongo Ko) is a Ubangian language spoken in Haut-Uele Province, DR Congo.

References

Mba languages
Languages of the Democratic Republic of the Congo